John Francis "Black Jack" Wilson (April 12, 1912 – April 19, 1995) was an American professional baseball pitcher. He played all or part of nine seasons in Major League Baseball (MLB) for the Boston Red Sox, Philadelphia Athletics, Washington Senators, and Detroit Tigers. He played college baseball at the University of Portland.

Wilson was a good hitting pitcher in his major league career, posting a .199 batting average with 34 runs, 3 home runs and 49 RBI in 281 games pitched.

Wilson served as a player-manager for the Salem Senators in 1947 and 1948.

Sources

Major League Baseball pitchers
Boston Red Sox players
Philadelphia Athletics players
Washington Senators (1901–1960) players
Detroit Tigers players
Hollywood Stars players
Globe Bears players
Tucson Lizards players
Portland Beavers players
Syracuse Chiefs players
Sacramento Solons players
Salem Senators players
Minor league baseball managers
Portland Pilots baseball players
Baseball players from Portland, Oregon
People from Edmonds, Washington
1912 births
1995 deaths